Edward Elliot-Square (born 7 May 1978) is a former English cricketer. Elliot-Square was a right-handed batsman who bowled right-arm medium pace.

Elliot-Square made his debut for Dorset in the 1997 Minor Counties Championship against Cornwall. From 1997 to 1999 he represented Dorset in 6 Minor Counties matches, with his final match for the county coming against Oxfordshire in the 1999 season.

In 1999 Elliot-Square played his only List A match for Dorset against Scotland in the 1999 NatWest Trophy, scoring 20 runs and bowling 10 expensive overs.

External links
Edward Elliot-Square at Cricinfo
Edward Elliot-Square at CricketArchive

1978 births
Living people
Cricketers from Winchester
English cricketers
Dorset cricketers